Berštejn Castle is a 16th-century Czech castle located just outside the village of Dubá in the Doksy municipality. Berštejn  also refers to a chateau near the castle.

Starý Berštejn
Starý Berštejn (old Berštejn) is now merely a ruin situated on a hilltop outside of Dubá.

Nový Berštejn
Nový Berštejn (new Berštejn) is a chateau just north of Dubá which has been converted to a hotel.

References

External links
berstejn.com

Hotels in the Czech Republic
Castles in the Liberec Region
Česká Lípa District